Kevin John Ufuoma Akpoguma (born 19 April 1995) is a professional footballer who plays as a centre back for Bundesliga club 1899 Hoffenheim. Born in Germany, Akpoguma was a youth international for Germany but switched and represents the Nigeria national team.

Club career
Akpoguma spent the 2016–17 season on loan at 2. Bundesliga side Fortuna Düsseldorf. On 21 April 2017, towards the end of the season, he collided with FC St. Pauli's Bernd Nehrig in a league match. Both players were hospitalised with Akpoguma suffering a broken neck.

Akpoguma made his first appearance in the Bundesliga the following season on 22 October 2017, replacing Stefan Posch at half-time in 1899 Hoffenheim's 1–1 draw with VfL Wolfsburg. Four days later, he made his first start for the club, in a 1–0 away to Werder Bremen in the second round of the DFB-Pokal.

International career
Born to a German mother and a Nigerian father, Kevin Akpoguma is eligible to play for Germany and Nigeria. He has represented Germany at youth level, playing for the U16, U17, U18, U19, U20, and U21 teams.

He was the captain of the German U-20 National, helping the team reach the quarterfinals of the 2015 FIFA U-20 World Cup in New Zealand.

In October 2018 he stated that he was open to playing to Nigeria.

On 21 September 2020, Nigeria national team coach Gernot Rohr stated that Akpoguma has switched allegiance to play for the Nigeria national team.

On 28 September he confirmed reports that he has decided to play for the Nigeria national team. Akpoguma made his debut with the Nigeria national team in a friendly 1–0 loss over Algeria on 9 October 2020.

Honours
Individual
 Fritz Walter Medal U18 Gold: 2013

References

External links

1995 births
Living people
People from Neustadt an der Weinstraße
Citizens of Nigeria through descent
Nigerian footballers
Nigeria international footballers
German footballers
Germany under-21 international footballers
Germany youth international footballers
Nigerian people of German descent
German sportspeople of Nigerian descent
Karlsruher SC players
TSG 1899 Hoffenheim players
TSG 1899 Hoffenheim II players
Fortuna Düsseldorf players
Hannover 96 players
3. Liga players
2. Bundesliga players
Bundesliga players
Association football central defenders
Footballers from Rhineland-Palatinate